Ulmus boissieri Grudz.,, a disputed species of elm found in Iran, was identified by Grudzinskaya in 1977. She equated her "new species" with the U. campestris f. microphylla collected in 1859 in Kerman Province and described in his Flora Orientalis (1879) by Boissier, for whom she named it, treating Boissier's specimen as the "type". The tree is endemic the provinces of Kermanshah (Qasr-e Shirin, Bisotun) and Kerman., and also the Zagros forests, growing with Quercus brantii,  Celtis australis, Platanus orientalis, Fraxinus sp., and Cerasus mahaleb.

Although two more recent Iranian treatises maintain the original taxon, Richens (1983), in line with Boissier's original U. campestris identification, sank U. boissieri as Ulmus minor, along with six other elms considered species by Soviet botanists. Grudzinskaya (1977) incorrectly stated that "U. boissieri was described by Boissier in the rank of a species". Boissier had in fact listed his small-leaved Persian elm as a form of the species, U. campestris. Grudzinskaya (1977) does not refer to the diagnostic field-elm feature of root-suckering.

Description
Ulmus boissieri is distinguished by its small leaves and fruits. The ovate, toothed leaves are 1.5 – 3 cm long, 1.2 – 2 cm broad, typically asymmetric at the base, the upper surfaces glabrous. The leaf veins number from 8 to 12; the petiole  2 – 3 mm long. The perfect apetalous wind-pollinated flowers are minute; the suborbiculate samarae 7 – 9 mm in diameter, with the seed located in the centre.

Boissier's 1859 herbarium specimen (Grudzinskaya's "type" tree) shows 'Rueppellii'-like leaves and samarae, a field elm from neighbouring Turkestan (see 'External links').

Pests and diseases
Not known.

Cultivation
The extent of cultivation within Iran is unknown. Aside from the old field elm cultivar 'Umbraculifera', elm specimens from Iran are extremely rare in cultivation outside the country (see 'Putative specimens' below).

Putatative specimens 
Four putative specimens from Iran are grown at the Sir Harold Hillier Gardens, UK (see 'Accessions').

Accessions

Europe
Sir Harold Hillier Gardens, Ampfield, Hampshire, England. Acc. no. 2001.0188, 4 putative specimens  grown from wild collected seed in Iran by D & S Pigott 2000. Plant Centre Field, marked only as Ulmus minor, Iran.

References

External links
"Herbarium specimen" - plants.jstor.org, le00011358 Labelled U. campestris f. microphylla Boiss., Kerman Province, Persia, 1859 (Pierre Edmond Boissier specimen); re-labelled 'type' Ulmus boissieri Grudz.; Herbarium Russian Academy of Sciences, 1977
 "Herbarium specimen" - plants.jstor.org, je00026201 Labelled Paratype of Ulmus boissieri Grudz.; twigs and flowers (1)
 "Herbarium specimen" - plants.jstor.org, je00026202 Labelled Paratype of Ulmus boissieri Grudz.; twigs and flowers (2)
  Sheet labelled U. campestris, field elm specimen, Astarabad, northern Persia (1901) (Transcaspian–Persian expedition, 1900-1901)
  Sheet labelled U. glabra Mill., field elm specimen, Sumbar River valley (1901) (Transcaspian–Persian expedition, 1900-1901)

boissieri
Controversial elm taxa
Ulmus articles with images
Endemic flora of Iran
Trees of Asia
Plants described in 1977